Barry Dean Loudermilk  (born December 22, 1963) is an American politician from the state of Georgia who has been the U.S. representative from  since 2015. The district covers a large slice of Atlanta's northern suburbs, including Marietta, Acworth and Smyrna, and a sliver of Atlanta itself.

Loudermilk won the Republican nomination for the seat in a runoff on July 22, 2014, over Bob Barr, and won the general election on November 4, 2014. He was reelected to a second term on November 8, 2016.

Early life and career
Loudermilk was born in Riverdale, Georgia. After graduating from high school, he enlisted in the United States Air Force, where he worked as a communications operations specialist for command, control and intelligence operations. Loudermilk served at duty stations in Texas, Hawaii and Alaska. Loudermilk left the Air Force in 1992.

Loudermilk attended the Community College of the Air Force to receive his Associate of Applied Science in 1987 before going on to receive his Bachelor of Science from Wayland Baptist University in 1992. He was a member of the Georgia state senate for almost three years, representing the 14th district. He served in the Georgia house of representatives from 2005 until 2011. Loudermilk resigned from the state senate on August 27, 2013, to focus on his congressional bid.

Loudermilk is a native of Georgia. He entered politics in 2001, when he was elected chairman of the Bartow county Republican party, serving until 2004. He was subsequently elected to the state house. He was elected to the state senate in 2010, and was sworn in in 2011. As a state senator, he served as chair of the senate science and technology committee and as secretary to the veterans, military and homeland security and public safety committees. He was also a member of the senate transportation committee. He holds an associate degree in telecommunications technology and a B.S. in occupational education and information systems technology.

Loudermilk is a former member of the Freedom Caucus and has been endorsed by the evangelical author and political activist for Christian nationalist causes, David Barton.

U.S. House of Representatives

Tenure

In February 2017, Loudermilk co-sponsored H.R. 861, which would eliminate the U.S. Environmental Protection Agency by 2018.

In September 2017, the Georgia-based credit bureau Equifax revealed a data breach that affected 143 million Americans and was characterized by technology journalists as "very possibly the worst leak of personal info ever to have happened". Four months earlier, Loudermilk, who had received $2,000 in campaign contributions from Equifax as part of an extensive lobbying effort, introduced a bill that would reduce consumer protections in relation to the nation's credit bureaus, including capping potential damages in a class action suit to $500,000 regardless of class size or amount of loss. The bill would also eliminate all punitive damages. After criticism from consumer advocates, Loudermilk agreed to delay consideration of the bill "pending a full and complete investigation into the Equifax breach."

Committee assignments
Committee on Financial Services
Subcommittee on Financial Institutions and Consumer Credit
Subcommittee on Oversight and Investigations
Committee on Science, Space, and Technology
Subcommittee on Environment
Subcommittee on Oversight
Committee on House Administration

Caucus memberships
 Republican Study Committee
 U.S.-Japan Caucus

Allegations of aiding the January 6 United States Capitol attack
On May 19, 2022, the United States House Select Committee on the January 6 Attack requested that Loudermilk appear for an interview about a tour he led of the United States Capitol Complex on January 5, 2021, the day before the 2021 United States Capitol attack. House Democrats had suggested Loudermilk aided in the attack, which he and House Republicans disputed. In June, Capitol police concluded that there was nothing suspicious about Loudermilk's tour. Capitol police chief Tom Manger said, "There is no evidence that Rep. Loudermilk entered the U.S. Capitol with this group on January 5, 2021." The next day, the committee released video of Loudermilk leading the tour of the Capitol complex on January 5 in areas "not typically of interest to tourists, including hallways, staircases, and security checkpoints"; the footage showed the group walking through tunnels underneath the Capitol, but not within the main building. A man in the tour group can also be seen taking photos of hallways. The committee then shared footage claiming the man was at the riot, showing footage of a man at the storming of the Capitol the next day.

Loudermilk filed an ethics complaint against Rep. Mikie Sherrill and other Members for alleging Loudermilk gave a reconnaissance tour of the Capitol on January 5.

Political positions
Loudermilk has an 83% score from conservative political advocacy group Heritage Action for his voting record.

Health care 
Loudermilk supports reforming Medicaid, Medicare and Social Security. He wants to repeal and replace the Affordable Care Act ("Obamacare"). He compared the 2017 Republican efforts to repeal Obamacare to the American Revolutionary War and World War II.

Loudermilk did not vaccinate his children against the mumps or measles. He believes that it is up to parents, not the government, to decide whether children receive vaccines.

Donald Trump
Loudermilk said he considers the presidency of Donald Trump a "movement" and has praised the concept of "Make America Great Again." He has credited Paul Ryan, rather than Trump, with Republican success in Congress. In 2017, Loudermilk called Ryan a "revolutionary thinker."

In December 2019, Loudermilk likened the impeachment of Trump to the crucifixion of Jesus. In a floor speech, he said, "When Jesus was falsely accused of treason, Pontius Pilate gave Jesus the opportunity to face his accusers... During that sham trial, Pontius Pilate afforded more rights to Jesus than the Democrats have afforded this president in this process", a fact pattern disputed by religious scholarship and rated by PolitiFact as "false."

In December 2020, Loudermilk was one of 126 Republican members of the House of Representatives to sign an amicus brief in support of Texas v. Pennsylvania, a lawsuit filed at the United States Supreme Court contesting the results of the 2020 presidential election, in which Joe Biden defeated Trump. The Supreme Court declined to hear the case on the basis that Texas lacked standing under Article III of the Constitution to challenge the results of an election held by another state.

On January 7, 2021, Loudermilk and 139 other House Republicans voted against certifying Arizona's and Pennsylvania's electoral votes, despite no evidence of widespread election fraud.

Economic issues 
In 2016, the Club for Growth named Loudermilk a "defender of economic freedom" for his conservative voting record on the economy.

Loudermilk supports a balanced budget amendment but does not consider it "politically viable."

Loudermilk supports tax reform and voted for the Tax Cuts and Jobs Act of 2017. He called the act a "big Christmas present" for his constituents, claiming it would reduce the deficit, improve the lives of all Americans, and cause more companies to hire due to increased revenues. He said, "I could understand it if all we were doing was just giving a corporate tax break—you could make that argument. But the bulk of the tax reform is giving middle-income Americans a significant tax cut."

Loudermilk supports dismantling the IRS and establishing a flat tax system.

Abortion 
Loudermilk is anti-abortion and believes that life starts at conception. He supports the right to life movement and has said, "Life is the ultimate right endowed by God and it is the responsibility of governments to protect that right, not to destroy it."

LGBT rights 
Loudermilk opposes federal legalization of same-sex marriage, believing it should be decided by states. In 2015, Loudermilk condemned the Supreme Court decision in Obergefell v. Hodges, which held that same-sex marriage bans violated the constitution. He has supported the First Amendment Defense Act.

See also
 Final Report of the Task Force on Combating Terrorist and Foreign Fighter Travel

References

External links

 Congressman Barry Loudermilk official U.S. House website
 Barry Loudermilk for Congress
 
 
 

|-

|-

|-

|-

1963 births
21st-century American politicians
Republican Party Georgia (U.S. state) state senators
Living people
Republican Party members of the Georgia House of Representatives
People from Bartow County, Georgia
Republican Party members of the United States House of Representatives from Georgia (U.S. state)